Kataib al-Khoul (Russian and Ossetian: Катаиб аль-Хоул, romanized: Kataib al'-Khoul), also known as the Ossetian Jamaat and Vilayat Iriston, was a militant Islamist organization connected to numerous attacks against the local and federal security forces in the Russian region of North Ossetia–Alania in the North Caucasus. It was part of the Caucasian Front of the Second Chechen War. Its existence inside a republic which is largely Russian Orthodox had led to denial by officials who refused to recognise that an Islamic insurgency group existed in Ossetia, and instead blamed the attacks on the Ingush Jamaat.

The Ossetian Jamaat, closely associated with the separatist conflict in nearby Chechnya, was established by Alan Digorsky, better known as Emir Saad. Its existence was first mentioned in May 2005 when Abdul-Halim Sadulayev created the Caucasian Front, Sadulayev referred to it as the Ossetian Sector of the Caucasian Front. Later after increased insurgency in parts of North-Ossetia, the group started to be referred to as Kataib al-Khoul. The group announced that it fought in favor of Chechnya's independence and was integrated into the Caucasian Front by the decree of the then President of Ichkeria, Sheikh Abdul Halim. Since the proclamation of the Caucasus Emirate in 2007, Kataib al-Khoul had similar goals to other Islamic nationalist insurgent groups in the region, as it sought to end Russian control of North Ossetia and establish an Ossetian Islamic state called Iriston.

Despite being a group that had claimed many attacks within North Ossetia targeting Russian forces, on 12 May 2009, Emir of the Caucasus Emirate Dokka Umarov issued a communique subsuming the rebel structures active in North Ossetia into the Emirate's Vilayat Galgayche subdivision. While Dokka Umarov did not give his reasons for this decision, some speculate that the reason was that since the assasination of the mayor of Vladikavkaz, Vitaly Karayev the activities of the Vilayat came to nothing for several months. This likely served as the ground for Dokka Umarov to disband the Vilayat.

Attackshttps://www.kavkazcentre.com/russ/content/2007/11/04/54134/severnaya-osetiya--svodka-boevykh-operatsij-dzhamaata-kataib-al-khoul.shtml
According to the official version, the cause was a short circuit. Four soldiers were killed, five were wounded. The Jamaat claimed responsibility for the explosion and said it was also planning aerial attacks.On 11 September 2006, a Mi-8 helicopter with the highest ranks of the 58th Army crashed on the outskirts of Vladikavkaz, killing 15 Russian soldiers. The militants claimed that Emir Saad personally shot down the helicopter from MANPADS. Official authorities denied the militant version of the attack.On 11 August 2007, Kataib al-Khoul claimed responsibility for an attack in the city of Mozdok, in which during a battle with members of the North Ossetian FSB two members of the FSB were killed and one other was wounded.On 21 October 2007, Vilayat Iriston claimed responsibility for a sabotage operation using an explosive device in which a member of the North Ossetian OMON was killed.On 12 December 2007, Vilayat Iriston claimed responsibility for the killing of two drug dealers in Moscow.On 30 December 2007, Vilayat Iriston claimed responsibility for the killing of Elbrus Margiev in VladikavkazOn 7 March 2008, in the center of Vladikavkaz, the head of the Organized Crime Control Department for North Ossetia, Mark Metsaev, was killed by militants belonging to the group.On 1 October 2008, Vilayat Iriston claimed responsibility for the killing of the leader of the Criminal Investigation Department of North Ossetia along with his son in VladikavkazOn 26 November 2008, The mayor of Vladikavkaz Vitaly Karayev, was killed by militants belonging to the group

In its just three years of existence, Kataib al-Khoul claimed responsibility for about 40 attacks in total.

References

External links
Kata'ib al-Khoul Aliases: Jamaat Kataib al-Khoul, Kataeb al-Ghoul, Kataib al-Khoul, Kataib al-Khoul Jamaat

Caucasian Front (militant group)
Islamism in Russia
Islamist groups
North Ossetia–Alania